Mansour Tanhaei (born March 31, 1986) is an Iranian football player.

Club career

Tanhaei joined Shahin Bushehr in 2009 after spending the previous two seasons at Etka Gorgan F.C.

Club career statistics
Last Update 14 June 2019

 Assist Goals

Honours

Club
Hazfi Cup
Runner up:1
2011–12 with Shahin Bushehr

References

1986 births
Living people
People from Qom
Iranian footballers
Etka Gorgan players
Shahin Bushehr F.C. players
Saipa F.C. players
Sanat Mes Kerman F.C. players
Sanat Naft Abadan F.C. players
Giti Pasand players
Khooneh be Khooneh players
Saba players
Aluminium Arak players
Azadegan League players
Persian Gulf Pro League players
Association football forwards